"He Loves Me (Lyzel in E Flat)" is a song by American singer Jill Scott from her debut studio album, Who Is Jill Scott?: Words and Sounds Vol. 1 (2000). The song was released as a single on November 21, 2001, in support of Scott's live album Experience: Jill Scott 826+ (2001). A music video edit of Scott's performance of the song in Washington, D.C., received heavy rotation on BET and VH1 cable stations. The song was nominated for Best Female R&B Vocal Performance at the 2003 Grammy Awards.

Track listing

Charts

References

2000 songs
2000s ballads
2001 singles
Contemporary R&B ballads
Hidden Beach Recordings singles
Jill Scott (singer) songs
Songs written by Jill Scott (singer)
Soul ballads